Tamtu may refer to:

Tiamat, Babylonian goddess
Tamtu, Burma